Movin' is the second studio album by American singer Jennifer Rush.

Overview
Originally released in Germany in late 1985, just as Rush was experiencing worldwide success with "The Power of Love" from her self-titled previous album, Movin''' became an instant hit there. The album reached No.1 for 14 weeks and went on to be the biggest selling album of 1986. Despite high sales for her previous album, Rush found it harder to follow up in the UK, where the album (released in 1986) only managed to reach No.32, mainly due to the lack of a hit single. The international first release was "Destiny", which charted highly in many countries, but only scraped the bottom of the top 100 in the UK. A second single "If You're Ever Gonna Lose My Love" also sold well in Europe. Other notable tracks include a decidedly electronic working of the Stevie Wonder song "Yester-Me, Yester-You, Yesterday", and "Ave Maria" (an original track), which was released as a single much later in 1991.

US success still eluded Rush and so following the release of this album she decided to relocate to the US from Germany in order to secure a wider fanbase for her next album, Heart Over Mind.

In some countries the Jennifer Rush debut album was a cross section of tracks from Jennifer Rush (1984) and Movin' , either titled Jennifer Rush (US, Canada, German Democratic Republic) or Movin''' (Venezuela, Singapore).

Track listing

 Spanish LP and Cassette pressings include a Spanish re-recording of "If You're Ever Gonna Lose My Love" titled "No Me Canso De Pensar En Ti", which is placed as the first track on the album while the original English version is placed as track 11.
 M.D. Clinic is a pseudonym used by producers Gunther Mende and Candy de Rouge in the writing credits.

Charts

Weekly charts

Year-end charts

Certifications

Release history

References

External links

1985 albums
Jennifer Rush albums
CBS Records albums